DeMarcus Lamon "Tank" Tyler (born February 14, 1985) is a former American football defensive tackle who played last for the Dodge City Law of Champions Indoor Football (CIF). He was drafted by the Kansas City Chiefs in the third round of the 2007 NFL Draft. He played college football at North Carolina State.

Tyler has also been a member of the Carolina Panthers and Chicago Bears.

Early years
Tyler played high school football at E.E. Smith High in Fayetteville, North Carolina. During his career he achieved all-conference honors, first-team All-Two Rivers Class 4-A Conference, All-Cape Fear Region accolades, and was Cape Fear Region Player of the Year in 2002. He was also invited to play in the 2002 Shrine Bowl.

College career
Tyler played college football at North Carolina State. During his senior season, he was received first-team All-Atlantic Coast Conference after recording 87 tackles, three sacks, and a forced fumble. He finished his college career with 173 tackles, five sacks, and two fumble recoveries.

Professional career

2007 NFL Combine

Kansas City Chiefs
Tyler was drafted by the Kansas City Chiefs in the third round of the 2007 NFL Draft. He played in 15 games during his rookie season, starting one. During his second season he started all 16 games at defensive tackle for the Chiefs, recording 29 tackles. In three years with the Chiefs he started 19 of 37 games, recording 62 tackles.

Carolina Panthers
Tyler was traded to the Carolina Panthers on October 19, 2009 for a fifth round pick in the 2010 NFL Draft. He was waived on September 4, 2010 during final cuts.

References

External links
Kansas City Chiefs bio

1985 births
Living people
Sportspeople from Fayetteville, North Carolina
Players of American football from North Carolina
American football defensive tackles
NC State Wolfpack football players
Kansas City Chiefs players
Carolina Panthers players
Chicago Bears players
Tampa Bay Storm players
Dodge City Law players